Franco Egidio Malerba (born 10 October 1946 in Busalla, Metropolitan City of Genoa, Italy) is an Italian astronaut and Member of the European Parliament. He was the first citizen of Italy to travel to space. In 1994, he was elected to the European Parliament on the lists of Forza Italia, serving until 1999.

Married to the former Marie-Aude Némo. They have one child. Recreational interests include mountaineering, skiing, and tennis. He is fluent in Italian, English, and French.

Education
1965	Maturità classica (Lyceum).
1970	University degree, Electronics Engineer, University of Genoa, Italy, specializing in the telecommunications field (laurea 110/110 cum Laude).
1974	Doctor in Physics, University of Genoa, (110/110) specializing in Biophysics (after research work at the Italian National Research Council (CNR) and at the National Institutes of Health, Bethesda, Maryland, USA).

Organizations
Founding Member of the Italian Space Society.

Research activities
1970-75	Research Assistant at CNR's Laboratorio de Biofisica e Cibernetica (Genoa) carrying experimental work on membrane biophysics (using squid axons) and biological membrane modeling with lipid bilayers.
1971	Lecturer of Cybernetics and Information Theory at the Physics Faculty, University of Genoa.
1972	Summer Research Assistant at the Nato Saclant Research Center (La Spezia, Italy) working on computer-aided signal detection methodologies for sonar data systems.
1972-74	Research Fellow at the National Institutes of Health (Bethesda, Maryland) designing, developing, testing and using a fast micro-spectrophotometer for research on photoreceptors biophysics (using frog retinas).
 1977-80 In 1977, Dr. Malerba was chosen by the European Space Agency (ESA) as one of four European Payload Specialist Candidates for the first Spacelab mission. After this selection he became a staff member at the European Space Research and Technology Centre (ESTEC) of ESA Space Science Department, Space Plasma Physics Division, working in the development, testing, and qualification of ES020 - PICPAB, an experiment in Ionospheric Plasma Physics for the first Spacelab payload, flown in 1983, involving the use of accelerated charged particle beams (cooperation involved French CNRS/CRPE, Norwegian NRDE and ESTEC).

Industry experience
1976-89	Held technical and technical management positions with Digital Equipment in Italy and in Europe. He worked mainly in the field of multiprocessor systems (Paris 1976, Milan 1977), computer networks engineering (Geneva 1981-85), and telecommunications technology (Rome 1986–88, and Sophia Antipolis in 1989).

Military experience
Reserve Officer, Marina Militare. Served in 1974-75 (Sottotenente Armi Navali); was assigned to the Destroyer  as Science Lecturer to the Naval Academy, and then to the Mariperman Technical Center in La Spezia working on ELF transmission systems.

Other skills
Obtained scuba diving license from the Calypso Scuba Club, Geneva (1984).

Flying status
Obtained Private Pilot License (College Park, Washington, D.C., 1973) and then the equivalent Italian flying license.

Spaceflight experience
After selection in 1989 as a Payload Specialist by the Italian Space Agency (ASI) and NASA, he became a staff member of ASI and was assigned to the NASA Johnson Space Center, Houston, Texas, for training. In September 1991, he was designated Prime Payload Specialist for the TSS-1 Space Shuttle mission. Malerba flew as the first Italian citizen in space on STS-46 (31 July 1992 to 7 August 1992). He is now involved with the Italian Space Agency (ASI) manned space flight program follow-on activities.

External links
 
 Spacefacts biography of Franco Malerba

1946 births
Italian astronauts
Astronaut-politicians
Living people
Engineers from Genoa
University of Genoa alumni
Space Shuttle program astronauts
National Research Council (Italy) people